General Directorate of the Mineral Research & Exploration  of Turkey (Turkish: Maden Tetkik ve Arama Genel Müdürlüğü, commonly known as MTA) is a scientific institution established by Ministry of Energy and Natural Resources in 1935.

MTA conducts geological and geophysical surveys all around Turkey in order to explore natural resources, like ore deposits and energy raw materials. The institution has 6 divisions with many different analysis labs, and a training facility for geologists and geophysical engineers in Ankara. Apart from focusing on fieldwork for mining research, MTA also has remote sensing facilities since 1975. Remote sensing unit operates under MTA Geophysics Research Division and TUBITAK has a cooperation since early 1970s.

MTA publishes Bulletin of the Mineral Research  and Exploration twice a year since 1936. Papers are published in  English and Turkish since 1950 and distributed worldwide.

See also

References

External links 
 MTA Official Site in English

Ministry of Energy and Natural Resources (Turkey)
1935 establishments in Turkey
Research institutes established in 1935
Organizations based in Ankara
Mining companies of Turkey
Government-owned companies of Turkey
Research institutes in Turkey